The 1980 Campeonato Paulista da Primeira Divisão de Futebol Profissional was the 79th season of São Paulo's top professional football league. São Paulo won the championship by the 12th time. XV de Piracicaba was relegated.

Championship
The championship would be divided into two rounds - in each round, the teams played against each other once, and the four best teams qualified to the Semifinals, with their winners qualifying to the Finals. The winners of each round qualified to the Championship Finals.

First round

First round Semifinals

|}

First round Finals

|}

Second round

Second round Semifinals

|}

Second round Finals

|}

Finals

|}

Aggregate table

Like in the previous year, the team with the fewest points would be relegated and the team with the second-fewest points would go to a playoff against the runner-up of the Second Level. as such, XV de Piracicaba was relegated and Francana had to dispute a playoff in neutral ground against Catanduvense.

Relegation Playoffs

|}

References

Campeonato Paulista seasons
Paulista